Muscula muscula is a moth of the family Erebidae. It is found on the Dodecanese Islands and Cyprus, as well as in Turkey, Iraq and Lebanon.

References

Moths described in 1899
Lithosiina
Moths of Europe
Moths of Asia